Sport Lisboa e Benfica is a Portuguese professional football team based in São Domingos de Benfica, Lisbon. The club was formed in 1904 and played its first competitive match on 4 November 1906, when it entered the inaugural edition of the Campeonato de Lisboa. They won their first title in 1910, and their first nationwide club competition in 1930, the Campeonato de Portugal, a knockout competition which determined the Portuguese champion among the winners of the regional championships. In 1934, an experimental league competition known as Primeira Liga was introduced in Portuguese football. Due to its success among the clubs, it became the official top-tier championship in 1938, in place of the Campeonato de Portugal. Since its first edition, Benfica have won a record 37 titles. Internationally, they won the European Cup twice, in 1961 and 1962.

Since their first competitive match, more than 750 players have appeared in first-team matches for the club, and almost 150 have made at least 100 appearances. Six former players went on to be first-team managers: Fernando Caiado, José Augusto, Toni, Artur Jorge, Shéu, and Fernando Chalana. Benfica's record appearance maker is Nené, who played 575 matches during his record 18-year career at the club; he is followed by António Veloso and Luisão, each with 538 appearances in 15 seasons. Manuel Bento, who appeared 465 times for the club, is the oldest player to have played for Benfica. He was 41 years and 298 days when he played against Belenenses on 20 May 1990.

Eusébio is the club's top goalscorer with 474 goals in 15 seasons, 317 of which were scored in league matches. Ten players have made more than 400 appearances, including four members of the 1961 European Cup-winning team. Other than Eusébio, only two players, Nené and José Águas, have scored more than 300 goals for the club.

Key
The list is ordered by date of debut.
Appearances as a substitute are included.
Statistics are correct up to and including the match played on 18 March 2023. Where a player left the club permanently after this date, his statistics are updated to the date of departure.

Players with 100 or more appearances

Players with fewer than 100 appearances

Footnotes

References
General
 
 

Specific

S.L. Benfica
Pl
S.L. Benfica
Association football player non-biographical articles